Nycteola indica is a moth of the family Nolidae first described by Rudolf Felder in 1874. It is found in Sri Lanka, India, Myanmar, Borneo, and Australia.

Description
Forewings grey. Some specimen with a dark triangle in the costal center. A submarginal row of darker dots present. Posterior dots are large.

References

Moths of Asia
Moths described in 1874
Nolidae